Catherine Arnaud (born 5 February 1963) is a French judoka. She competed in the women's lightweight event at the 1992 Summer Olympics.

References

External links
 

1963 births
Living people
French female judoka
Olympic judoka of France
Judoka at the 1992 Summer Olympics
Sportspeople from Bordeaux